Arthur Robert Schmidt (born June 17, 1937) is an American film editor with about 27 film credits between 1977 and 2005. Schmidt has had an extended collaboration with director Robert Zemeckis from Back to the Future film trilogy (1985—1990) to Cast Away (2000).

Schmidt is the son of film editor Arthur P. Schmidt; it is said that the son's education in editing began when he watched his father editing the film Sunset Boulevard (1950). Schmidt graduated from Santa Clara University with a bachelor's degree in English.

Schmidt received the Academy Award for Best Film Editing for Who Framed Roger Rabbit (1988) and Forrest Gump (1994). In addition to these Oscars, Schmidt has won several "Eddies" from the American Cinema Editors for Pirates of the Caribbean: The Curse of the Black Pearl (with Craig Wood and Stephen E. Rivkin, 2003), Forrest Gump, and for a television special The Jericho Mile (1979). He has been nominated for major editing awards (including the BAFTA Award for Best Editing) for Coal Miner's Daughter (1980), Back to the Future (with Harry Keramidas, 1985), The Last of the Mohicans (with Dov Hoenig, 1992), and Cast Away (2000). He was the executive producer for The Labyrinth (2010).

Schmidt received the 2009 American Cinema Editors Career Achievement Award, which was presented to Schmidt by Robert Zemeckis.

Filmography (as editor)

See also 
 List of film director and editor collaborations

References

Further reading 
 Buckner, Bonnie (2001). "Conversation with Arthur Schmidt," The Motion Picture Editors Guild Magazine Vol. 22, No. 2 (May/June 2001). Online version retrieved December 15, 2007.

External links 
 

1937 births
American film editors
Best Film Editing Academy Award winners
Living people